Thiago Neves Augusto (born 27 February 1985), known as Thiago Neves, is a Brazilian professional footballer who plays as an attacking midfielder.

Club career
Thiago Neves was born in Curitiba. Playing for Fluminense in 2008, he scored a hat-trick in the home leg of the Copa Libertadores final – Thiago Neves had by then already scored once in the away leg (in Ecuador) — (during the 2008 Copa Libertadores) but ending up on the losing side, as Fluminense drew 5–5 on aggregate with LDU de Quito and were eventually downed in the penalty shootout. Neves was one of the players who missed a penalty.

On 30 August 2008, it was announced that Thiago Neves joined Hamburger SV player and was seen as the ideal replacement for the outgoing Rafael van der Vaart. Fluminense received 30% of the profit of R$ 3,502 thousand and rest of them belonged to a third party owner, "D.I.S Esporte e Organização de Eventos LTDA".

He left the club on 31 January 2009 and joined Al-Hilal for €7 million. Neves scored a hat-trick against the rival team Al-Ittihad which shaped their historic 5–0 victory. In 2012, he signed for Fluminense for the exact fee he was sold and at the end of that season he was crowd champion in Brazil for his new club. In July 2013 he was sold back to Al-Hilal for €6 million.

After four years in the Middle East, Neves returned to Brazil in 2011, being joined by Flamengo in January.

On 5 January 2017 Cruzeiro agrees to hire Thiago until 2019.

On  27 January 2020, after leaving Cruzeiro, Thiago agrees with Grêmio, but after  fourteen matches he has his contract terminated by the board.

On 19 September 2020 Thiago is announced with Sport Recife,but after a year his contract was terminated.

International career

He made his international debut in a friendly match against Sweden on 26 March 2008. Later that year, he was called up to the Brazil U23 team for the 2008 Summer Olympics. At the Group C match, he scored two goals in the win over China PR national under-23 football team, 3–0. Brazil finished third.

He was placed in the preliminary squad list for the 2011 Copa América by Mano Menezes, but later missed out on a place in the final list for the tournament. He was also called for the 2011 and 2012 editions of the Superclásico de las Américas.

Career statistics

Club

International

Honours
Fluminense
Série A: 2012
Copa do Brasil: 2007
Taça Guanabara: 2012
Campeonato Carioca: 2012

Al-Hilal
Saudi Premier League: 2009, 2010
Crown Prince Cup: 2010
Kings Cup: 2015

Flamengo
Taça Guanabara: 2011
Taça Rio: 2011
Campeonato Carioca: 2011

Cruzeiro
Copa do Brasil: 2017, 2018
Campeonato Mineiro: 2018, 2019

Grêmio
Campeonato Gaúcho: 2020

Brazil
2008 Summer Olympics: Bronze medal winner
Superclásico de las Américas: 2012

Individual
Bola de Prata: 2007, 2017
Bola de Ouro: 2007
Best Player of Campeonato Paranaense Under-20: 2004
Saudi Professional League Player of the Round: Round 11
2011 Campeonato Carioca Best Attacking Midfielder
2011 Campeonato Carioca Best Player (People's Choice)
2011 Campeonato Carioca Best Player
Campeonato Brasileiro Team of the year: 2017

References

External links
 
 
 Football Lineups Profile
 
 

1985 births
Living people
Footballers from Curitiba
Brazilian footballers
Association football midfielders
Brazil international footballers
Footballers at the 2008 Summer Olympics
Olympic footballers of Brazil
Olympic bronze medalists for Brazil
Olympic medalists in football
Medalists at the 2008 Summer Olympics
Campeonato Brasileiro Série A players
J2 League players
Bundesliga players
Saudi Professional League players
UAE Pro League players
Paraná Clube players
Vegalta Sendai players
Fluminense FC players
Hamburger SV players
Al Hilal SFC players
Al Jazira Club players
CR Flamengo footballers
Cruzeiro Esporte Clube players
Grêmio Foot-Ball Porto Alegrense players
Sport Club do Recife players
Brazilian expatriate footballers
Brazilian expatriate sportspeople in Japan
Expatriate footballers in Japan
Brazilian expatriate sportspeople in Germany
Expatriate footballers in Germany
Brazilian expatriate sportspeople in Saudi Arabia
Expatriate footballers in Saudi Arabia
Brazilian expatriate sportspeople in the United Arab Emirates
Expatriate footballers in the United Arab Emirates